The Least Successful Human Cannonball is the fifth studio album by the German thrash metal band Destruction, released in 1998 by Brain Butcher Compact. It was the final album made with Thomas Rosenmerkel on vocals, and the third and last release of the "Neo-Destruction" period of the band. Later on, all recordings made with Rosenmerkel were completely disowned by the band, and as such are no longer considered part of Destruction's official discography.

Track listing

Credits 
Thomas Rosenmerkel – vocals
Michael Piranio – lead guitar
Mike Sifringer – rhythm guitar
Christian Engler – bass
Olly Kaiser – drums

References 

Destruction (band) albums
1998 albums